(Alastair) Brian Clarke Harrison  (3 October 1921 – 21 August 2011) was a British Conservative politician.

Harrison was born in 1921 in Melbourne, Australia. He was the son of the soldier and politician Eric Harrison. He was educated at Geelong Grammar School and during World War II served in the Australian Army from 1940 and as a volunteer with the Australian Independent Companies (Commandos) in Halmahera and Borneo.
 
After the war he was at Trinity College, Cambridge. He rowed for Cambridge in the record-breaking crew in the 1948 Boat Race. Most of the crew rowed for Great Britain in the 1948 Summer Olympics; Harrison did not participate in the Games as Australia did not enter a squad.

Harrison returned to Australia from 1950 to 1951 and studied immigration and development. As a descendant of Fiske Goodeve Fiske-Harrison he inherited  Copford Hall, and became Lord of the manor of Copford in Essex where he then settled to become a farmer and estate manager. He became London director of the Commercial Bank of Australia in January 1966. He served as a councillor on Lexden and Winstree Rural District Council in Essex. He was also High Sheriff of Essex in 1979 and a Deputy Lieutenant of the county.

Harrison was elected in the 1955 general election as Member of Parliament (MP) for Maldon and served until he stood down in February 1974 general election. He served as Parliamentary Private Secretary to John Hare while Hare was Minister of State for the Colonies between 1955 and 1956, Secretary of State for War from 1956 to 1958 and Minister of Agriculture, Fisheries and Food from 1958 to 1960.

Harrison died in Colchester on 21 August 2011 aged 89 following a short illness.

See also
List of Cambridge University Boat Race crews

References

External links 
 
 Obituary of Brian Harrison, The Daily Telegraph, 18 September 2011

1921 births
2011 deaths
Conservative Party (UK) MPs for English constituencies
Australian Army personnel of World War II
UK MPs 1955–1959
UK MPs 1959–1964
UK MPs 1964–1966
UK MPs 1966–1970
UK MPs 1970–1974
Councillors in Essex
Alumni of Trinity College, Cambridge
Cambridge University Boat Club rowers
Deputy Lieutenants of Essex
High Sheriffs of Essex
People educated at Geelong Grammar School
Members of Parliament for Maldon
Australian Army officers
Australian emigrants to the United Kingdom